Lucky Girl (also known as My Daughter's Secret Life) is a 2001 Canadian drama film starring Elisha Cuthbert, Sherry Miller, and Charlotte Sullivan, directed by John Fawcett.

Plot
Kaitlyn (Elisha Cuthbert) is a high school student whose obsession with gambling leads to her accumulating a mountain of debt. Her habit also causes a high degree of family tension.

The film commences with Kaitlyn in a mathematics class. She is ecstatic because she has won a prize on a lottery ticket. It is soon revealed that Kaitlyn and her friends are saving money in order to travel to Amsterdam. Kaitlyn is a young girl who is willing to take extreme risks in order to get what she wants. She seems academically inclined. For example, she is quick to answer a question correctly even though she was not paying attention in class. She also seems to be well-respected and popular in school. For example, many of her classmates attend her birthday where they play poker and Kaitlyn manages to win the game.

Kaitlyn views the recent sequence of events as a means by which to raise money for her trip. She soon becomes involved in sporting gambling in order to make more money for her trip. Her parents view her enthusiasm for sports such as basketball and football as merely a phase. Her mother suspects that Kaitlyn watches the sports in order to watch the opposite sex. Her father, however, advises her to be cautious and to never make a bet over five dollars. He also uses Kaitlyn's new interest as a means by which to teach Kaityln's brother mathematics.

As Kaitlyn begins to lose money, she starts behaving more erratically. She steals her mother's credit card, becomes addicted to Internet gambling, neglects her personal appearance and some of her male classmates assault her physically because she did not pay them the money that she had promised. Because of this she then borrows money from a shady loan shark named Blair Noth. The stakes increase when Kaitlyn becomes involved in illegal gambling. By this time, her life is out of control, she lies about the extent of her problems and she loses more money than she ever thought possible.

Once her parents discover the true nature of Kaitlyn's troubles, she is at the point where she is forced by Blair and his wife, Judy, to use her body as a means by which to overcome her debts, just like what they did to Ron. With the help of Ron, her mother rescues her then bashes Blair across the head twice with a wheellock and Kaitlyn admits to her family how gambling has overtaken her life.  The police then arrive to Blair's house and collect enough evidence against both Blair and Judy, who are arrested for their crimes, while Ron sits outside the house in his truck, indicating he finally had the courage to call the police on them.

The film ends with the notion that admitting that one has a problem and obtaining help is a very different thing from actually changing one's behaviour.

Cast
Elisha Cuthbert as Kaitlyn Palmerston
Sherry Miller as Valerie Palmerston
Evan Sabba as Ron Lunderman
Greg Ellwand as Blair Noth
Sarah Osman as Cheryl Bemberg
Jonathan Whittaker as Alastair Palmerston
Charlotte Sullivan as Janice
Victoria Snow as Judy
Jordan Madley as Mauree
Steven Taylor as Terry Palmerston

Shooting locations
Toronto, Ontario, Canada.

References

External links
 
 

2001 films
2001 drama films
English-language Canadian films
Films directed by John Fawcett
Canadian drama films
Films about gambling
2000s English-language films
2000s Canadian films